Simon de Waal (born in Amsterdam in 1961) is a Dutch writer.

He has specialized in television and film scripts, he won the Golden Calf in 2000 (grand prize for the Netherlands Film), for best screenplay for the film Leak. Leak also won best film, best director and best actor, and several international awards, making it one of the most successful Dutch films. Several of the series he wrote, were either nominated or awarded with prizes for best television series in the Netherlands, for instance Unit 13, Bureau Kruislaan and Baantjer. Baantjer won the 'Golden Televizier Ring' for best series, after being nominated for it twice.

His book Cop vs Killer was nominated for best thriller in 2005, in the Netherlands as well as in Belgium. He still works - part-time, due to his success as a writer - as a homicide detective in Amsterdam, since 1986. At the age of 18, in 1979, he started working as a police officer in Amsterdam. He has contributed to almost every police-series in the Netherlands.

In 2005, he collaborated with Lynda La Plante, creator of Prime Suspect and The Commander, and co-wrote a 2x90 minutes episode for The Commander (ITV, 2005) called "Blacklight".

His thriller Pentito was published November 2007. It is based on a true story, about an Italian mafia informant in the Netherlands, who was forced to give information to law enforcement in order to survive. Pentito was nominated in Belgium and The Netherlands as Best Thriller 2007, and won the award (Diamond Bullet) in Belgium.

In 2003 he started his own production company Screenpartners, that up to now co-produced the police TV series 'Boks' (on TV in 2006), the film 'Kapitein Rob en het Geheim van professor Lupardi' (in theatres November 29, 2007) and the film 'Cop vs Killer', which he also directed.

In 2008, he wrote a book with bestselling author Appie Baantjer, as Baantjer en De Waal. It was very successful, selling over 60.000 copies in the Netherlands alone. The series continued with 12 books, from which the first two books were credited as Baantjer & de Waal, and the ten books thereafter were credited De Waal & Baantjer. This was done at Appie Baantjer's request, who said: "I'm already famous, now you deserve your name to come first".

The bookseries "De Waal & Baantjer" was made into a successful tv-series named "Bureau Raampoort", the name of the police-station featured in the books. 

After Pentito, Simon de Waal wrote the thrillers "Nemesis" and "Systema". Both books were received very well, and got very good reviews.

In 2012 he wrote the script for Cop vs Killer, based on his first book. The script was made into a film, which was supposed to be directed by Hans Pos, but Pos fell sick on the 3d day of shooting. Producer Shooting Star asked De Waal to direct the film from there on, which he did. He finished the film in 2012, and lead actor Jeroen Willems won a Golden Calf for best actor at the Netherlands Film Festival.

In cooperation with production company Shooting Star Filmcompany, De Waal and his production company Screenpartners are developing a new TV series and a feature film called Famous Last Words, and a film called The Fear of God.

References

External links
 

Screenpartners website, in English and Dutch

1961 births
Living people
Dutch male writers
Writers from Amsterdam
Golden Calf winners